This is a list of 197 species in Oxyethira, a genus of microcaddisflies in the family Hydroptilidae.

Oxyethira species

 Oxyethira abacatia Denning, 1947 i c g
 Oxyethira absona Flint, 1991 i c g
 Oxyethira acegua Angrisano, 1995 i c g
 Oxyethira aculea Ross, 1941 i c g
 Oxyethira acuta Kobayashi, 1977 i c g
 Oxyethira aeola Ross, 1938 i c g
 Oxyethira ahipara Wise, 1998 i c g
 Oxyethira alaluz Botosaneanu, 1980 i c g
 Oxyethira albaeaquae Botosaneanu, 1995 i c g
 Oxyethira albiceps (McLachlan, 1862) i c g
 Oxyethira allagashensis Blickle, 1963 i c g
 Oxyethira anabola Blickle, 1966 i c g
 Oxyethira andina Kelley, 1983 i c g
 Oxyethira angustella Martynov, 1933 i c g
 Oxyethira apinolada Holzenthal & Harris, 1992 i c g
 Oxyethira araya Ross, 1941 i c g
 Oxyethira archaica Malicky, 1975 i c g
 Oxyethira arctodactyla Kelley, 1983 i c g
 Oxyethira argentinensis Flint, 1982 i c g
 Oxyethira arizona Ross, 1948 i c g
 Oxyethira artuvillosus (Wells, 1981) i c g
 Oxyethira aspera Yang & Kelley in Yang, Kelley & Morse, 1997 i c g
 Oxyethira assia Botosaneanu & Moubayed, 1985 i c g
 Oxyethira azteca (Mosely, 1937) i c g
 Oxyethira bamaga  g
 Oxyethira baritu Angrisano, 1995 i c g
 Oxyethira bicornuta Kelley, 1983 i c g
 Oxyethira bidentata Mosely, 1934 i c g
 Oxyethira bifurcata Yang & Kelley in Yang, Kelley & Morse, 1997 i c g
 Oxyethira bogambara Schmid, 1958 i c g
 Oxyethira boreella Svensson & Tjeder, 1975 i c g
 Oxyethira braziliensis Kelley, 1983 i c g
 Oxyethira brevis Wells, 1981 i c g
 Oxyethira burkina Gibon, Guenda & Coulibaly, 1994 i c g
 Oxyethira caledoniensis Kelley, 1989 i c g
 Oxyethira calori  g
 Oxyethira campanula Botosaneanu, 1970 i c g
 Oxyethira campesina Botosaneanu, 1977 i c g
 Oxyethira circarverna Kelley, 1983 g
 Oxyethira circaverna Kelley, 1983 i c g
 Oxyethira coercens Morton, 1905 i c g
 Oxyethira colombiensis Kelley, 1983 i c g
 Oxyethira columba (Neboiss, 1977) i c g
 Oxyethira complicata Wells, 1990 i c g
 Oxyethira copina Angrisano, 1995 i c g
 Oxyethira cornuta Wells, 1990 i c g
 Oxyethira costaricensis Kelley, 1983 i c g
 Oxyethira cotula Wells & Dudgeon, 1990 i c g
 Oxyethira cuernuda Holzenthal & Harris, 1992 i c g
 Oxyethira culebra Holzenthal & Harris, 1992 i c g
 Oxyethira dactylonedys Kelley, 1983 i c g
 Oxyethira dalmeria (Mosely, 1937) i c g
 Oxyethira datra Olah, 1989 i c g
 Oxyethira delcourti Jacquemart, 1973 i c g
 Oxyethira desadorna Moulton & Harris, 1997 i c g
 Oxyethira discaelata Kelley, 1983 i c g
 Oxyethira distinctella McLachlan, 1880 i c g
 Oxyethira dorsennus Kelley, 1989 i c g
 Oxyethira dualis Morton, 1905 i c g
 Oxyethira dunbartonensis Kelley, 1981 i c g
 Oxyethira ecornuta Morton, 1893 i c g
 Oxyethira efatensis Kelley, 1989 i c g
 Oxyethira elerobi (Blickle, 1961) i c g
 Oxyethira espinada Holzenthal & Harris, 1992 i c g
 Oxyethira ezoensis Kobayashi, 1977 i c g
 Oxyethira falcata Morton, 1893 i c g
 Oxyethira fijiensis Kelley, 1989 i c g
 Oxyethira flagellata Jacquemart, 1963 i c g
 Oxyethira flavicornis (Pictet, 1834) i c g
 Oxyethira florida Denning, 1947 i c g
 Oxyethira forcipata Mosely, 1934 i c g b
 Oxyethira frici Klapalek, 1891 i c g
 Oxyethira galekoluma Schmid, 1958 i c g
 Oxyethira garifosa Moulton & Harris, 1997 i c g
 Oxyethira glasa (Ross, 1941) i c g
 Oxyethira gomera Kelley, 1984 i c g
 Oxyethira gracilianoi  g
 Oxyethira grisea Betten, 1934 i c g
 Oxyethira guariba  g
 Oxyethira hainanensis Yang & Xue, 1992 i c g
 Oxyethira harpagella Kimmins, 1951 i c g
 Oxyethira harpeodes Yang & Kelley in Yang, Kelley & Morse, 1997 i c g
 Oxyethira hartigi Moretti, 1981 i c g
 Oxyethira hilosa Holzenthal & Harris, 1992 i c g
 Oxyethira hozosa Harris & Davenport, 1999 i c g
 Oxyethira hyalina (Mueller, 1879) i c g
 Oxyethira iannuzzae  g
 Oxyethira iglesiasi Gonzalez & Terra, 1982 i c g
 Oxyethira ikal Wells & Huisman, 1992 i c g
 Oxyethira inaequispina Flint, 1990 i c g
 Oxyethira incana Ulmer, 1906 i c g
 Oxyethira indorsennus Kelley, 1989 i c g
 Oxyethira insularis Kelley, 1989 i c g
 Oxyethira itascae Monson & Holzenthal, 1993 i c g
 Oxyethira jamaicensis Flint, 1968 i c g
 Oxyethira janella Denning, 1948 i c g
 Oxyethira josifovi Kumanski, 1990 i c g
 Oxyethira kelleyi Harris in Harris & Armitage, 1987 i c g
 Oxyethira kingi Holzenthal & Kelley, 1983 i c g
 Oxyethira klingstedti Nybom, 1982 i c g
 Oxyethira lagunita Flint, 1982 i c g
 Oxyethira lobophora Mey, 1998 i c g
 Oxyethira longipenis  g
 Oxyethira longispinosa Kumanski, 1987 i c g
 Oxyethira longissima Flint, 1974 i c g
 Oxyethira luanae  g
 Oxyethira lumipollex Kelley & Harris, 1983 i c g
 Oxyethira lumosa Ross, 1948 i c g
 Oxyethira macrosterna Flint, 1974 i c g
 Oxyethira maryae Kelley, 1983 i c g
 Oxyethira matadero Harper & Turcotte, 1985 i c g
 Oxyethira maya Denning, 1947 i c g
 Oxyethira melasma Kelley, 1989 i c g
 Oxyethira merga Kelley, 1983 i c g
 Oxyethira michiganensis Mosely, 1934 i c g
 Oxyethira mienica Wells, 1981 i c g
 Oxyethira minima (Kimmins, 1951) i c g
 Oxyethira mirabilis Morton, 1904 i c g
 Oxyethira mirebalina Botosaneanu, 1991 i c g
 Oxyethira misionensis Angrisano, 1995 i c g
 Oxyethira mithi Malicky, 1974 i c g
 Oxyethira mocoi Angrisano, 1995 i c g
 Oxyethira novasota Ross, 1944 i c g
 Oxyethira obscura Flint, 1974 i c g
 Oxyethira obtatus Denning, 1947 i c g
 Oxyethira orellanai Harris & Davenport, 1992 i c g
 Oxyethira oropedion Kelley, 1989 i c g
 Oxyethira ortizorum Botosaneanu, 1995 i c g
 Oxyethira pallida (Banks, 1904) i c g b
 Oxyethira paramartha Schmid, 1960 i c g
 Oxyethira parazteca Kelley, 1983 i c g
 Oxyethira parce (Edwards & Arnold, 1961) i c g
 Oxyethira paritentacula Kelley, 1983 i c g
 Oxyethira peruviana Harris & Davenport, 1999 i c g
 Oxyethira petei Angrisano, 1995 i c g
 Oxyethira picita Harris & Davenport, 1999 i c g
 Oxyethira pirisinui Moretti, 1981 i c g
 Oxyethira plumosa (Wells, 1981) i c
 Oxyethira presilla Harris & Davenport, 1999 i c g
 Oxyethira pseudofalcata Ivanov, 1992 i c g
 Oxyethira puertoricensis Flint, 1964 i c g
 Oxyethira quinquaginta Kelley, 1983 i c g
 Oxyethira rachanee Chantaramongkol & Malicky, 1986 i c g
 Oxyethira ramosa Martynov, 1935 i c g
 Oxyethira rareza Holzenthal & Harris, 1992 i c g
 Oxyethira retracta Wells, 1981 i c g
 Oxyethira retrosa  g
 Oxyethira ritae Angrisano, 1995 i c g
 Oxyethira rivicola Blickle & Morse, 1954 i c g
 Oxyethira roberti Harper & Roy, 1980 i c g
 Oxyethira rossi Blickle & Morse, 1957 i c g
 Oxyethira sagittifera Ris, 1897 i c g
 Oxyethira santiagensis Flint, 1982 i c g
 Oxyethira savanniensis Kelley & Harris, 1983 i c g
 Oxyethira scaeodactyla Kelley, 1983 i c g
 Oxyethira scutica Kelley, 1989 i c g
 Oxyethira sechellensis Malicky, 1993 i c g
 Oxyethira sencilla Holzenthal & Harris, 1992 i c g
 Oxyethira septentrionalis  g
 Oxyethira serrata Ross, 1938 i c g
 Oxyethira setosa Denning, 1947 i c g
 Oxyethira sichuanensis Yang & Kelley in Yang, Kelley & Morse, 1997 i c g
 Oxyethira sida Blickle & Morse, 1954 i c g
 Oxyethira sierruca Holzenthal & Harris, 1992 i c g
 Oxyethira simplex Ris, 1897 i c g
 Oxyethira simulatrix Flint, 1968 i c g
 Oxyethira singularis  g
 Oxyethira sininsigne Kelley, 1981 i c g
 Oxyethira sinistra  g
 Oxyethira smolpela Wells, 1991 i c g
 Oxyethira spinosella McLachlan, 1884 i c g
 Oxyethira spirogyrae (Mueller, 1879) i c g
 Oxyethira spissa Kelley, 1983 i c g
 Oxyethira tamperensis Malicky, 1999 i c g
 Oxyethira tasmaniensis Wells, 1998 i c g
 Oxyethira tega Flint, 1968 i c g
 Oxyethira teixeirai Harris & Davenport, 1992 i c g
 Oxyethira tenei Gibon, Guenda & Coulibaly, 1994 i c g
 Oxyethira tenuella Martynov, 1924 i c g
 Oxyethira tica Holzenthal & Harris, 1992 i c g
 Oxyethira torresiana  g
 Oxyethira touba Gibon, 1988 i c g
 Oxyethira triangulata Wells, 1981 i c g
 Oxyethira tristella Klapalek, 1895 i c g
 Oxyethira tropis Yang & Kelley in Yang, Kelley & Morse, 1997 i c g
 Oxyethira ulmeri Mosely, 1937 i c g
 Oxyethira unidentata McLachlan, 1884 i c g
 Oxyethira unispina Flint, 1974 i c g
 Oxyethira vaina Harris & Davenport, 1999 i c g
 Oxyethira velocipes (Barnard, 1934) i c g
 Oxyethira verna Ross, 1938 i c g
 Oxyethira vipera Kelley, 1983 i c g
 Oxyethira volsella Yang & Kelley in Yang, Kelley & Morse, 1997 i c g
 Oxyethira waipoua Wise, 1998 i c g
 Oxyethira warramunga Wells, 1985 i c g
 Oxyethira zeronia Ross, 1941 i c g b
 Oxyethira zilaba (Mosely, 1939) i c g

Data sources: i = ITIS, c = Catalogue of Life, g = GBIF, b = Bugguide.net

References

Oxyethira
Articles created by Qbugbot